Hotel Shangri-La is a full-service boutique hotel located at 1301 Ocean Avenue in Santa Monica, California. It is an example of Streamline Moderne architecture and Art Deco design. The Hotel Shangri-La is family-owned, and is currently run by Pakistani-American businesswoman Tehmina Adaya, who took over in 2004. Her late father, business and real estate tycoon Ahmad Adaya, purchased the hotel in 1983. The hotel reopened in October 2008 following a $30 million renovation. It was ranked as having one of the top five rooftop bars in Los Angeles in 2013 by The New Zealand Herald.

Design
The hotel is an example of Streamline Moderne architecture. Despite its extensive renovation, the hotel’s interior design maintains the original design of the Art Deco time period. The hotel has 70 rooms and 30 suites with views of either downtown or the Pacific Ocean.

In May 2009, the Shangri-La was listed by TIME along with five other hotels in their Green Design 100. The hotel utilises many energy saving features, such as a solar powered pool, Natura Green toiletries, low-flow dual flush toilets and an on-site water filtration system.

Notable guests and events
Hotel Shangri-La has been host to many celebrity guests, including Cyndi Lauper, Diane Keaton, Bill Murray, Matthew Broderick, Bill Clinton, Madonna and Tom Cruise.

The Shangri-La has been a backdrop for the filming of many TV shows, music videos, movies, and other film productions, including:

 Randy Newman's I Love LA music video (1984)
 White Men Can't Jump with Wesley Snipes and Woody Harrelson (1992)
 The Net with Sandra Bullock (1995)
 The rockumentary DiG! (2004)
 One Girl's Confession (1953)

Most recently, Melrose Place and reality TV show The Bachelor have featured Hotel Shangri-La.

Controversy
In August 2012 the hotel was convicted for discriminating against a group of eighteen young Jewish people in July 2010. The group, mostly members of the Young Leadership Division of the local chapter of the Friends of the Israel Defense Forces had been holding a pool party on the roof of the hotel. The California Superior Court heard that the hotel owner, Tehmina Adaya, a Pakistani-born Muslim, took a number of actions against the group including forcing the FIDF group to take down the banners, literature and other evidence of its presence and directing hotel security guards to prevent members of the group from swimming in the pool. The court ordered the hotel and its owner to pay damages and statutory penalties totalling over $1.6 million.

References

External links
 Hotel website

Buildings and structures in Santa Monica, California
Streamline Moderne architecture in California
Art Deco hotels
Hotels in Los Angeles County, California
Companies based in Santa Monica, California